Crocodile Island is a 2020 Chinese action monster film directed by Xu Shixing and Simon Zhao, and starring Gallen Lo as a single father who lands on a crocodile island with his daughter (Liao Yinyue) due to a plane malfunction and must battle with beast-sized creatures inhabiting the island. This web film was released for online streaming on 4 February 2020 on iQiyi. Crocodile Island became a commercial success, grossing ¥16.70 million against a budget of ¥8 million and is currently the highest-grossing web film of 2020 in China.

Plot
The surrounding areas of the Devil's Sea is also known as the Bermuda Triangle of Asia. Due to electromagnetic interference, aviation accidents are common in the region. Lin Hao (Gallen Lo) and his daughter Yi (Liao Yinyue) are passengers of Flight GZ261. As it flies over the Devil's Sea, the plane malfunctions, causing an emergency landing on a crocodile island. Hao and other driving passengers encounter enormous sized crocodiles and spiders and engages in a battle for survival. When Yi is captured by the giant beasts, Hao fights for his life to rescue his daughter.

Cast
Gallen Lo as Lin Wei (林浩)
Liao Yinyue as Lin Yi (林伊)
Wang Bingxiang as Cheng Jie (程杰)
Dang Wei as Li Zhi (李治)
Hu Xue'er as Jin Jiayan (金佳妍)
He Qiwei as Cao Fang (曹方)
Zhao Zuo as Lu Wenbing (路文兵)
Zhao Zhiyan as Shao Liqi (邵麗琪)
Jack Wayne as Bill (比爾)
Bruce Allen as Andrew (安德魯)
Su Man as Gao Wen (高文)
Cai Tingting as Female passenger
Meng Lichao as Passenger
Zhang Cangyu as Crew member
Zheng Cunyuan as 181 passenger
Han Jinyue as Injured passenger
Patrick Alleyn as Captain
Zhao Jinyi as First officer
Guo Lei as Greedy passenger
Yu Shichao as Male passenger

Reception

Critical
Crocodile Island earned a score of 2.8/5 stars on the Chinese media rating site, Douban. Criticism was directed towards the film's clichéd plot and poor CGI effects.

Box office
Despite its low rating and lack of known cast members besides Gallen Lo, the film was a steady hit. The film earned ¥1.53 on its first day of release on 4 February 2020, topping other web films. By its second day of release, it has earned ¥3 million. By its fifth day of release, it has reached a gross ¥8 million, recuperating its budget. After playing for seven days, the film had reached the ¥10 million mark.

By 2 March 2020, the film has earned ¥14.03 million, with a total of 5.614 million views. As of 31 March 2020, Crocodile Island had grossed a total of ¥16.70 million and is currently the highest-grossing web film of 2020 in China.

References

2020 films
2020 action films
2020s monster movies
Chinese action films
Giant monster films
2020s survival films
2020s Mandarin-language films
Internet films
Films about crocodilians
Films set on uninhabited islands
Films about aviation accidents or incidents